Emilio Nsue López (born 30 September 1989) is a professional footballer who plays for Primera División RFEF club CF Intercity. Born in Spain, he captains the Equatorial Guinea national team. A versatile player, he plays mainly as a right-back but can also play as a winger.

Nsue began his career at Mallorca, where he appeared in 153 competitive games and four La Liga seasons, and spent time on loan at Real Sociedad and Castellón. In 2014, he joined English club Middlesbrough, and helped them gain promotion to the Premier League in 2016. Nsue signed for Birmingham City in January 2017, and a year later moved into Cypriot football, spending 18 months with APOEL, a season with Apollon Limassol, and another season with APOEL. After six months without a club, he joined Bosnian Premier League club Tuzla City in 2022.

As Nsue was born in Spain to an Equatoguinean father and a Spanish mother, he was eligible to represent both nations at international level, and initially played for Spain at youth level, winning European championships at under-19 level in 2007 and under-21 level in 2011. In 2013, he made his senior international debut for Equatorial Guinea, his father's country, and two years later represented that nation at the 2015 Africa Cup of Nations.

Club career

Mallorca
Nsue was born in Palma, Majorca, in the Balearic Islands, and began his football career as a forward in the youth system of RCD Mallorca. He made his professional debut for the club on 3 February 2008, playing the last few minutes of a 1–1 draw at Villarreal. He added a few more minutes the following week, in a goalless home draw with Almería.

For 2008–09, Nsue was loaned to Castellón of the Segunda División. Regularly used in a comfortable campaign for the Valencians, he scored twice in a 4–1 win at home to Levante on 18 October 2008.

Nsue joined another second-tier club, Real Sociedad, on loan for the 2009–10 season. Although rarely a starter, he was an important member of the attack as the Basque team returned to La Liga after a three-year absence.

Nsue returned to Mallorca for 2010–11 and began the season in the starting eleven, the first match being a 0–0 home draw with Real Madrid. On 3 October 2010 he scored his first competitive goal for the club, heading in from a corner in a 1–1 draw at Barcelona. He appeared in all 38 league games and netted four times as his team narrowly avoided relegation.

In 2011–12 Nsue played in several matches as an attacking right back, and totalled nearly 2,000 minutes of action (20 starts) to help Mallorca rank eighth. After conversations with manager Joaquín Caparrós during pre-season, it was agreed that he would start the following campaign in that position.

Middlesbrough
On 1 August 2014, Nsue joined English Football League Championship club Middlesbrough, signing a three-year contract as a free agent. He was signed by Aitor Karanka, who knew him from the Spanish youth set-up. Eight days later he made his debut, coming on as a substitute for Albert Adomah for the last 23 minutes of a 2–0 win over Birmingham City at the Riverside Stadium. On 12 August he made his first start, playing the whole of a 3–0 win at Oldham Athletic in the first round of the 2014–15 League Cup.

Boro reached the play-off final at Wembley on 25 May 2015. They lost 2–0 to Norwich City, and Nsue played the second half in place of Dean Whitehead after both goals had already been conceded. Despite Karanka's insistence that the player would only be used in defence as an emergency procedure, he played much of his second season at right back. On 28 November 2015, he scored his first goal in English football to complete a 2–0 win at Huddersfield Town. On 15 December, he netted the only goal of a home win over Burnley that put Middlesbrough top of the table.

Nsue played 37 of 46 league games in 2015–16 as Boro achieved automatic promotion to the Premier League. He played the first three undefeated matches in the top flight, before being dropped for Antonio Barragán.

Birmingham City
Nsue signed a three-and-a-half-year contract with Birmingham City of the Championship on 18 January 2017; the fee, officially undisclosed, was believed by the Birmingham Mail to be £1m with a further £1m in add-ons. He made his debut in the starting eleven for the league visit to Norwich City on 28 January, playing at right back; Birmingham lost 2–0. He was an unused substitute for the next match, but appeared in every match thereafter, and "single-handedly tred to drag Blues up the pitch" in the final fixture of the season, away to Bristol City, which his team needed to win to avoid relegation. His only goal of the campaign came against Queens Park Rangers on 18 February in stoppage time in a 4–1 home defeat. Changes of management and personnel, and the need to stabilise a struggling team, meant Nsue was no longer a first choice in the 2017–18 side. He played regularly under Harry Redknapp's management in the early part of the season, but Steve Cotterill preferred the more defensive Maxime Colin at right back, and in the January 2018 transfer window, Nsue was allowed to leave.

Cyprus
Nsue signed a two-and-a-half-year deal with Cypriot First Division champions APOEL in January 2018; the fee was undisclosed. He went straight into the starting eleven for the visit to Doxa on 14 January; his headed goal after 26 minutes was Apoel's third in an 8–0 win. He made 26 league appearances in his first 13 months with the club, before a dispute with manager Paolo Tramezzani led to his contract being terminated for disciplinary reasons.

Having spent the 2019–20 season with another First Division club, Apollon Limassol, Nsue returned to APOEL in September 2020 on a one-year contract.

Tuzla City
Having been a free agent since leaving APOEL at the end of the 2020–21 season, Nsue signed for Bosnian Premier League club Tuzla City on 9 February 2022 until the end of the season.

He made his debut for the club on 26 February, coming on as a substitute in the second half of a 1–1 away draw against city rivals Sloboda. On 12 March 2022, he scored his first goal for Tuzla City in his fourth appearance in a 2–1 away win over Velež Mostar in the Bosnian Premier League. Only two months after joining the club, Nsue left Tuzla City in April 2022.

International career

Spain
Nsue represented his native Spain at all under-age levels. He was a member of the under-17 squad for the 2006 European Championships, but was injured in their opening match and took no further part in the finals. He started all five matches as Spain's under-19s won the 2007 European Championships, and was again part of the squad for the following year's tournament. Spain failed to progress past the group stage, losing to both Germany and Hungaryaccording to UEFA's technical report, "one of the poignant images of the tournament was provided by striker Emilio Nsue who was so upset by missed chances that he played the closing minutes [against Hungary] weeping disconsolately." He scored twice in a 4–0 defeat of Bulgaria in the third group match that meant they still qualified for the 2009 FIFA U-20 World Cup. Nsue played in two of the three group stage matches, scoring twice in an 8–0 win against Tahiti, and played the whole of the round of 16 match in which Spain were eliminated by Italy. Nsue made his under-21 debut in 2009. He was part of the 2011 European title-winning squad, but appeared only once, as a substitute in the group stages against the Czech Republic.

Equatorial Guinea
Nsue turned down an invitation to represent his father's native country, Equatorial Guinea, at the 2012 Africa Cup of Nations as he wanted to be a part of the Spanish team for the Olympics, but he did not make the final cut. In March 2013, he signed a contract with the Equatoguinean Football Federation, committing himself to attend all call-ups in which he was included, all expenses paid.

He scored on his debut for Equatorial Guinea in an unofficial friendly with Benin on 21 March 2013; he captained the team and played the first 45 minutes. He was again captain on his first competitive appearance, when he scored a hat-trick in a 4–3 win over Cape Verde in a 2014 World Cup qualifier. FIFA later declared him ineligible for that match and for the return fixture, awarding both games to Cape Verde by a 3–0 scoreline.

Nsue captained Equatorial Guinea's team as they hosted and finished fourth in the 2015 Africa Cup of Nations. He scored the tournament's opening goal in a 1–1 draw with the Republic of the Congo on 17 January at the Estadio de Bata.

Career statistics

Club

International
Scores and results list Equatorial Guinea's goal tally first, score column indicates score after each Nsue goal.

Honours
Spain U19
UEFA European Under-19 Championship: 2007
Spain U20
Mediterranean Games: 2009
Spain U21
UEFA European Under-21 Championship: 2011

References

External links

1989 births
Living people
Footballers from Palma de Mallorca
Spanish footballers
Spain youth international footballers
Spain under-21 international footballers
Equatoguinean footballers
Equatorial Guinea international footballers
Association football defenders
Association football wingers
Association football forwards
Association football utility players
RCD Mallorca B players
RCD Mallorca players
CD Castellón footballers
Real Sociedad footballers
Middlesbrough F.C. players
Birmingham City F.C. players
APOEL FC players
Apollon Limassol FC players
FK Tuzla City players
Tercera División players
La Liga players
Segunda División players
English Football League players
Premier League players
Cypriot First Division players
Premier League of Bosnia and Herzegovina players
2015 Africa Cup of Nations players
2021 Africa Cup of Nations players
Mediterranean Games gold medalists for Spain
Mediterranean Games medalists in football
Competitors at the 2009 Mediterranean Games
Citizens of Equatorial Guinea through descent
Spanish expatriate footballers
Equatoguinean expatriate footballers
Equatoguinean expatriate sportspeople in England
Expatriate footballers in England
Equatoguinean expatriate sportspeople in Cyprus
Expatriate footballers in Cyprus
Expatriate footballers in Bosnia and Herzegovina
Spanish sportspeople of Equatoguinean descent
Equatoguinean sportspeople of Spanish descent
CF Intercity players